Devaria or Devaliya or Deoria is a village in Anjar Taluka of Kutch at a distance of about 3 km from Anjar town  of Kachchh District of Gujarat in India.

History 

Devaria it is one of the 19 villages founded by Kutch Gurjar Kshatriyas or Mistris, as they are known in Kutch. These group of warriors were also skilled architects and have contributed to the erection of many historical monuments of kutch.

These Mistris first moved into Saurashtra in early 7th century and later a major group entered Kutch in 12th century and established themselves at Dhaneti. Later from 12th century onwards they moved to settle themselves between Anjar and Bhuj and founded the villages of Anjar, Sinugra, Khambhra, Nagalpar, Khedoi, Madhapar, Hajapar, Kukma, Galpadar, Reha, Vidi, Ratnal, Jambudi, Devaliya, Lovaria, Nagor, Chandiya, Meghpar and Kumbharia.  During the years of laying of railway lines in British India around 1850-1930 many members of Mistris of Kutch moved out and made themselves into big railway contractors throughout India. Some of them entered into Coal mines business as well.  The Mistris of these villages have built and developed the old infrastructure around the villages in late 1890 from their earnings during those time.

 However, majority of old houses of Mistris with unique architect were destroyed in the earthquake of 26 January 2001.

Temples
At entrance of village is a very famous and big temple complex known as Khakchok Mandir.  The main saint name is Shree Ramchandra Das Maharaj. At present time this temple is good for village peoples there all facility for water, food and rest-house in this temple. Every year on  Guru Purnima celebration is held in this temple and many people form far and near, attain this celebration.

Kuldevi temples of many clans of the Kutch Gurjar Kshatriyas communities can also be found in the village. The Kuldevi temples of Chamunda Mata of Chawdas, Taunks, Sikotar Mata of Marus are located in the village. Further, the Mistri community have also built a Hanuman temple, few years back from their personal donations. 
Also there are parias and deris of Dadas and Satis of their community in a walled compound in back side of village, where many members of different clans come to pay their respects. These parias are several centuries old.

References 

Villages in Kutch district